Pirrung is a surname. Notable people with the surname include: 

Eva Pirrung (born 1961), German footballer
Josef Pirrung (1949–2011), German footballer
Roy Pirrung (born 1948), American runner